The sky is the area above the Earth as seen from the ground.

Sky or SKY may also refer to:

 The atmosphere, gases surrounding a planet or other material body
 The heavens, religious cosmological or transcendent supernatural place
 Outer space, the expanse that exists beyond Earth and between celestial bodies

People

Persons
 Amy Sky (born 1960), Canadian musician, actress, and TV host
 Big Sky, later stage name for Canadian professional wrestler and actor Tyler Mane
 Captain Sky (born 1957), American musician and singer
 Reby Sky (born 1986), character in Total Nonstop Action Wrestling
 Velvet Sky (born 1981), character in Total Nonstop Action Wrestling

 Li Xiaofeng (born 1985), nicknamed Sky, Chinese professional gamer
 Ron Nesher (aka Sky, Sky Da Mac or Ron Sky Nesher, an Israeli rapper, born 1983)

 Sky Andrew (born 1962), English Olympia and sports agent
 Sky Ferreira (born 1992), American singer-songwriter, model, and actress
 Sky Low Low (1928–1998), Canadian professional midget wrestler
 Sky Metalwala, a boy from Redmond, Washington who disappeared in 2009
 Sky Rompiendo, Colombian producer, songwriter and DJ
 Sky Saxon (1937–2009), American musician
 Suryakumar Yadav (born 1990), Indian cricketer known by his initials SKY.

Religion and mythology
 Sky deity, a deity associated with the sky

Fictional characters
 Sky Mangel, a character from the Australian television soap opera Neighbours
 Sky Smith, a character from the British science fiction television series The Sarah Jane Adventures
 Sky Tate, a character from the Power Rangers television series universe
 Sky (Winx Club), a character in Winx Club
 Sky, a character in the Shantae franchise
 Sky, a character from Total Drama: Pahkitew Island

Places
 Griffing Sandusky Airport (IATA airport code SKY), Ohio, USA
 Sky (skyscraper), New York, USA
 Sky Crater, Thule, 486958 Arrokoth (Ultima Thule), Kuiper Belt, Solar System

Business

Aviation
 Sky Airline, in Chile
 Skymark Airlines, in Japan by ICAO code
 Sky Paragliders, a Czech aircraft manufacturer
 Sky Airlines, Antalya, Turkey
 Sky Aviation (Indonesia)
 Sky Aviation (Sierra Leone)
 Sky Aviation Leasing International, acquired by Goshawk Aviation
 Blue Sky Airlines, Armenia
 SkyTeam, an airline alliance

Broadcasting
 Sky Group, a pan-European satellite broadcasting company
 Sky Deutschland, its German and Austrian subsidiary
 Sky Cinema (Germany), a channel of Sky Deutschland
 Sky Sport (Germany), a channel of Sky Deutschland
 Sky Atlantic (German TV channel), a channel of Sky Deutschland
 Sky Switzerland, its Swiss subsidiary
 Sky Ireland, its Irish subsidiary
 Sky Italia, its Italian subsidiary
 Sky HD (Italy), a channel of Sky Italia
 Sky Sport (Italian TV channel), a channel of Sky Italia
 Sky TG24, a channel of Sky Italia
 Sky Uno, a channel of Sky Italia
 Sky Atlantic (Italian TV channel), a channel of Sky Italia
 Sky UK, its UK subsidiary
 Sky One, a channel of Sky UK
 Sky Two, a channel of Sky UK
 Sky+, a product of Sky UK
 Sky+ HD, a product of Sky UK
 Sky Go, a service of Sky UK
 Sky Broadband, a service of Sky UK
 Sky Cinema, a channel of Sky UK
 Sky News, a channel of Sky UK
 Sky Sports, a channel of Sky UK
 Sky Atlantic, a channel of Sky UK
 SKY Brasil, a subscription television service in Brazil
 Sky México, a subscription television service in Mexico, Central America and Dominican Republic
 Sky News Australia, a TV channel
 Sky Angel, a Christian TV and radio service
 Sky Racing, an Australian racing broadcaster
 Sky Sports Radio, Australia
 Sky HD (South Korea)
 Sky Living
 Sky Media Group, an Estonian media company
 Sky Plus, an Estonian radio station
 SKY Radio, a Russian language radio station in Estonia
 Sky Network Television, a subscription television service in New Zealand
 Sky News New Zealand
 Sky Sport (New Zealand), sports-oriented television channels
 Sky 5, formerly "SKY 1" and "the BOX"
 Sky Movies (New Zealand), subscription television movie channels
 Sky Box Office (New Zealand), a group of movie pay-per-view channels
 SKY PerfecTV!, a Japanese satellite broadcasting company
 Sky Turk, a Turkish national news channel
 Sky Cable Corporation, a Filipino telecommunications company involved primarily in pay television
 Sky Cable, a Philippine cable television provider
 Tata Play, an Indian satellite broadcasting company formerly known as Tata Sky
 WSKY-FM, an FM radio station in Florida
 WSKY-TV, SKY 4 TV, a North Carolina television station
 Sky Radio Group, a chain of Dutch radio stations
 Sky Radio, a Dutch radio station, part of Sky Radio Group

Other
 Sky Financial Group or Sky Bank, former American financial services holding company
 Sky Global, Canadian communication network and secure-messaging provider
 Sky Railway, Tourist Railroad in New Mexico

Books and Periodicals
 Sky Magazine, a publication of BSkyB
  Sky Kids magazine, included with Sky Magazine from 2004 to 2009
 SKY Magazine, a UK entertainment magazine published between the late 1980s and June 2001
 The Sky (magazine), an amateur astronomy magazine published between 1935 and 1941
 Delta Sky Magazine (aka "Sky"), magazine of Delta Air Lines

Film and TV

Film
 Sky (2015 film), a French-German film
 Sky (2021 film), a Russian film

Television series 
 Sky (TV serial), a 1975 British children's fantasy series
 Sky (Malaysian TV series), a 2007 Malaysian Chinese idol drama
 Sky (Israeli TV Series), a 2021 Israeli teen sci-fi drama series
 "Sky" (The Sarah Jane Adventures), a television episode
 The Sky (Canadian TV series)

Music

Groups
 Sky (American band), 1970s
 Sky (Canadian band), 1997–2005
 Sky (English/Australian band)
 Nina Sky, US musical twins

Albums 
 Sky (Faye Wong album), 1994
 Sky (Sky album), 1979
 Sky 2 (album), 1980, released as Sky in North American markets
 Sky (Yui Horie album), 2003
 The Sky (album), by Anita Kerr and Rod McKuen

Songs 
 "Sky" (Playboi Carti song),  2020
 "Sky" (Sonique song), 2000
 "Sky" (Titanium song), 2012
 "Sky", by Alan Walker and Alex Skrindo, 2017
 "Sky", by Crash Vegas from Red Earth, 1989
 "Sky", by Damien Leith from The Winner's Journey, 2006
 "Sky", by the Human League from Credo, 2011
 "Sky", by Jolin Tsai from J-Game, 2005

Sports
 Chicago Sky, a women's basketball team
 Team Sky, a British cycling team
 SkyRace or Sky, a skyrunning discipline
 SKY Racing Team VR46, an Italian motorcycle team

Other uses 
 SKY technique, or spectral karyotype, in cytogenetics
 Saturn Sky, an automobile
 Sky (hieroglyph), ancient Egyptian
 SKY (universities), 3 universities in South Korea
 Sky blue
 Sky Bar, candy 
 SKY (keyboard layout), for Japanese with Latin alphabet 
 Sky (video game), 2019

See also 

 Sky island (disambiguation)
 Skye (disambiguation)
 Isle of Skye, Scotland
 Skyy (disambiguation)
 
 
 Celestial (disambiguation)
 Heaven (disambiguation)
 Space (disambiguation)

English masculine given names
English feminine given names
English unisex given names